The Sony α55 (model variants SLT-A55V with GPS, SLT-A55 without GPS depending on country) is a midrange-level SLT camera, released in August 2010.

Its design is novel due to its being the first digital single-lens translucent camera (SLT), along with the Sony α33. As an SLT it employs a semi-transparent mirror instead of an opaque mirror, which enables phase detection autofocus in live view.

The design also replaces the optical viewfinder present in conventional DSLR with a high-resolution electronic viewfinder. The translucent mirror is fixed in position so does not have to flip up to take a still image, enabling rapid continuous shots of up to 10 frames per second. The static mirror also eliminates "mirror slap", the noise produced by the movement of the mirror during a shutter actuation, making the A55 quieter than standard DSLRs.

The A55 is one of the first four Sony Alpha DSLR / SLT cameras with video mode included, capable of 1080i.  It is also capable of shooting 1080p at 30fps. The SLT design means that it is capable of using phase-detection autofocus during video recording. It has body-integrated image stabilization, and a 16.2 MPx APS-C CMOS sensor.

The camera's body-integrated image stabilization produces heat, causing the camera to stop video recording after these recording times:

Features 

 Konica Minolta A-mount lens bayonet.

Video 

 AVCHD 1920/1080 50i or 60i (depending on region)
 MPEG-4 1080 30p or 25p (depending on region)

External links

Reviews
 dPreview
 Imaging Resource
 Digital Trends

References

Cameras introduced in 2010
55
Live-preview digital cameras

ja:Α (カメラ)#ソニーαシリーズ第3世代